This is a list of diplomatic missions in Guinea. The capital Conakry currently hosts 38 embassies. Several other countries have honorary consuls to provide emergency services to their citizens.

Embassies in Conakry

Other posts in Conakry 
 (Delegation).

Non-resident embassies

Closed missions

See also 
 Foreign relations of Guinea
 List of diplomatic missions of Guinea
 Visa requirements for Guinean citizens

References 

Guinea
Foreign relations of Guinea
Diplomatic missions